Lucas França (born 16 May 1968) is a Brazilian boxer. He competed in the men's light middleweight event at the 1992 Summer Olympics.

References

1968 births
Living people
Brazilian male boxers
Olympic boxers of Brazil
Boxers at the 1992 Summer Olympics
Boxers at the 1991 Pan American Games
Pan American Games bronze medalists for Brazil
Pan American Games medalists in boxing
Sportspeople from São Paulo
Light-middleweight boxers
Medalists at the 1991 Pan American Games
20th-century Brazilian people
21st-century Brazilian people